Self-Portrait with Seven Fingers is an oil painting by Belarusian-French painter Marc Chagall, painted in 1913 in France. This oil on canvas is a self-portrait in which the artist represents himself painting a reduced version of Of Russia, of Donkeys and Others, with seven fingers on one hand. It is kept as part of the Chagall collection at the Stedelijk Museum Amsterdam, in Amsterdam, Netherlands.

See also
List of artworks by Marc Chagall

References

External links
Self-Portrait with Seven Fingers

1913 paintings
Paintings by Marc Chagall
Self-portraits
Paintings in Amsterdam
Paintings about painting
Cattle in art
Churches in art